That Girl is the debut solo album by American country music artist Jennifer Nettles, lead vocalist of the country duo Sugarland. It was released on January 14, 2014, by Mercury Nashville. The album features 10 songs written or co-written by Nettles and a cover of Bob Seger's "Like a Rock". Nettles collaborated with songwriters Butch Walker, Richard Marx and Sara Bareilles, among others. The album was produced by Rick Rubin at his Shangri-La Studios in Malibu, California.

The album's lead single, the title track, was released in August 2013.

Critical reception

That Girl garnered generally positive reception from music critics. At Metacritic, they assign a weighted average Metascore to the album based upon selected independent rating and review, which based upon six reviews, the album holds a rating of a 71 indicating "generally favorable" reviews. At The New York Times, Jon Caramanica gave a positive review, and highlighted that "Only rarely does this album capture Ms. Nettles’s remarkable voice, a twang-thick burr with real soul-music depth." Brian Mansfield at USA Today rated the album four out of four stars, and affirmed that she "shows off her breathtaking voice." At The Oakland Press, Gary Graff rated the album three out of four stars, and evoked that "We certainly don't want to see Nettles abandon Sugarland, but here’s hoping that she's not done exploring these other musical terrains, either." Mikael Wood of Los Angeles Times gave a positive review, and affirmed that "Her loss sounds liberating." At The Boston Globe, Sarah Rodman gave a positive review, and stated that "While several tunes could appear on a Sugarland album, it is a less commercial, contemporary country-sounding release and there is a sense of individuality stamped on the songs."

Jon Freeman of Country Weekly graded the album a B+, and commented that "The resulting album is earthy, warm and spacious, not sounding too fussed over or suffocated with studio tricks." At Roughstock, Matt Bjorke rated the album four-and-a-half stars, and felt that the release may not contain the country hits like some would expect; however, he wrote that it was "long on charming vocal performances, stellar lyrics and some of the most timeless feeling new songs" he could think of over the past two years. Got Country Online rated it four stars, and commented on that it took many listens to become appreciative of the material, but "when you listen closely you will find an album full of touching, relatable stories told by a strong, emotive voice." However, Allmusic's Thom Jurek rated it three stars, and cautioned that "some of these songs feel too calculated or require more subtlety to completely pull off." At Rolling Stone, Christopher R. Weingarten rated the album three stars out of five, noted how "That Girl doesn't have much of a through line", but "What it does have is plenty to love."

Track listing

Personnel
Musicians
 Jennifer Nettles – lead vocals, backing vocals
 Ian McLagan – keyboards
 Smokey Hormel – acoustic guitars, electric guitars 
 Matt Sweeney – acoustic guitars, electric guitars
 Jason Lader – bass guitar
 Chad Smith – drums
 Alex Acuña – percussion
 Lenny Castro – percussion
 The Dap-Kings horn section (11):
 Cochemea Gastelum – baritone saxophone
 Neal Sugarman – tenor saxophone 
 Dave Gray – trumpet

Brass, woodwinds and strings
 David Campbell – arrangements and conductor
 Chris Bleth – bass clarinet, alto flute, bass flute, oboe
 Marty Krystall – clarinet
 Steve Kujala – alto flute, bass flute
 Joel Peskin – baritone saxophone
 Brian Scanlon – tenor saxophone
 Steve Holtman – trombone
 David Stout – trombone 
 Wayne Bergeron – flugelhorn, trumpet
 Dan Fornero – flugelhorn, trumpet
 Chris Gray – trumpet
 Lee Thornburg – trumpet
 Doug Tornquist – tuba
 Joe Meyer – French horn
 Suzie Katayama – cello, string contractor
 Steve Richards – cello
 Andrew Duckles – viola
 Charlie Bisharat – violin, concertmaster 
 Jackie Brand – violin
 Alyssa Park – violin
 Sara Parkins – violin
 Michele Richards – violin
 Josefina Vergara – violin

Production
 Rick Rubin – producer
 Dana Nielsen – recording, digital editing 
 Greg Fidelman – recording assistant 
 Eric Lynn – recording assistant 
 Sean Oakley – recording assistant 
 Robin Goodchild – additional recording assistant 
 Rouble Kapoor – additional recording assistant 
 Sara Killion – additional recording assistant 
 Scott Moore – additional recording assistant 
 Gabriel Roth – horn recording (11)
 Wayne Gordon – horn recording assistan (11)
 Simon Guzmán – horn recording assistant (11)
 Jason Gossman – digital editing 
 Andrew Scheps – mixing at Punkerpad West (Van Nuys, California)
 Justin Hergett – mix assistant 
 Stephen Marcussen – mastering at Marcussen Mastering (Hollywood, California)
 Dave Covell – production assistant 
 Karen Naff – art direction 
 Craig Allen – design 
 James Minchin III – photography 
 Gail Gellman and Gellman Management – management

Chart performance
The album debuted at No. 5 on the Billboard 200 with sales of 54,046 copies sold. In the following weeks the album sold 19,559, 15,012, and 12,754 respectively for a total of 101,461.  The album has sold 200,000 copies in the U.S. as of April 2016.

Weekly charts

Year-end charts

Singles

References 

2014 debut albums
Jennifer Nettles albums
Mercury Nashville albums
Albums produced by Rick Rubin
Albums recorded at Shangri-La (recording studio)